Barce fraterna is a species of thread-legged bug in the family Reduviidae. It is found in the Caribbean, Central America, North America, and South America.

Subspecies
These three subspecies belong to the species Barce fraterna:
 Barce fraterna annulipes Stål, 1867
 Barce fraterna banksii Baker, 1910
 Barce fraterna fraterna (Say, 1832)

References

Further reading

 

Reduviidae
Articles created by Qbugbot
Insects described in 1832
Taxa named by Thomas Say